Saint-Lô is a commune in northwest France, the capital of the Manche department in the region of Normandy.

Although it is the second largest city of Manche after Cherbourg, it remains the prefecture of the department. It is also chef-lieu of an arrondissement and two cantons (Saint-Lô-1 and Saint-Lô-2). The placename derives from that of a local saint, Laud of Coutances.

The commune has 18,931 inhabitants who are called Saint-Lois(es). The names of Laudois(es), Laudien(ne)s or Laudinien(ne)s are also cited. A martyr city of World War II, Saint-Lô was decorated with the Legion of Honour in 1948 and was given the nickname "Capital of the Ruins", a phrase popularised by Samuel Beckett.

Geography

Location

The city was born under the name of Briovera on a rocky outcrop of schist belonging to the Armorican Massif, in the Cotentin Peninsula, between the confluences of the Vire – which dominates the city centre – with the Dollée and Torteron, two rivers channelled in their urban sections. This historic heart of the city became L'Enclos, a site well suited to passive defence.

The east of the territory is the former commune of Sainte-Croix-de-Saint-Lô, south of Saint-Thomas-de-Saint-Lô, absorbed in 1964.

Climate

Saint-Lô has a mild oceanic climate characterised by mild winters and temperate summers. Rainfall is quite frequent throughout the year but most abundant in autumn and winter, in connection with the disturbances coming from the Atlantic Ocean. Rarely intense, they often fall in the form of drizzle. There are between 30 and 40 days of frost per year.

Transport
Saint-Lô is located in the centre of the department of Manche and is therefore a node of communication between Nord-Cotentin and southern Manche.

Road

Saint-Lô lies halfway along the Coutances–Bayeux axis. A bypass road was commissioned in the 1980s to allow the decongestion of the city from the south. To open up the port of Cherbourg, the region and the department decided the construction of a dual carriageway, . It is a part of the European route E03 and enables direct connection to Rennes and Europe from the south, through the interchange at Guilberville. The southern section now connects Saint-Lô directly to the A84 autoroute, allowing motorway access to Caen and Rennes. The commissioning of the northern section, which is currently under construction, will meanwhile allow access to Cherbourg and England via the Route nationale 13. The construction of the dual carriageway allowed the extension of the small South ring road heading west and its mutation into genuine urban bypass. It has also enabled the creation and expansion of new business zones which contribute strongly to the current growth of the agglomeration.

Rail

It is in the majority of services for travellers in the direction of Caen via Lison or in the direction of Coutances. A few trains, two daily return trips, serve as far as Rennes via Avranches.

Following the electrification of the section of railway between Lison and Saint-Lô during 2006, the SNCF and local communities experienced a direct Intercités service (without change of train) to the Gare Saint-Lazare in Paris for two years, between December 2008 and December 2010. This service was not sustained due to a lack a sufficient number of passengers. There is also the disused former industrial line to Condé-sur-Vire. The section between Gourfaleur and Condé-sur-Vire, adjacent to the towpath along the Vire, is used by the Vélorail [rail cycle] of the Vire valley since 2007.

Urban transport network
Urban transportation is provided by the Transports Urbains Saint-Lô Agglomération: TUSA (formerly Transport Urbains Saint-Lô Agneaux), was created in 1980. In 2010, the network consisted of four lines (Odyssée, Azur, Horizon and Alizé) with 15 buses and one Ocitolà transport on demand minibus. However, since 3 January 2011, it is composed of three lines (1, 2 and 3) still with 15 buses and one Ocitolà transport on demand minibus. In 2008, the company recorded more than 850,000 journeys.

On 15 May 2013, seven new vehicles were integrated with the fleet, namely five  Cytios 4/44, and two Mercedes-Benz Citaro K BHNS.

A new vehicle wrapping campaign is underway, the yellow livery will disappear in favour of a red livery. Added to this, a campaign of improving vehicle facilities, to meet the new standards of accessibility of public transit, including on-board announcements and scrolling banners.

Intercity transport network

The commune is associated with the departmental public buses by the lines:
 001 : Cherbourg-Octeville – Valognes – Carentan – Saint-Lô
 002 : Coutances – Marigny – Saint-Lô
 109 : Saint-Lô – Periers
 113 : Villedieu-les-Poêles – Saint-Lô
 117 : Guilberville – Torigni – Saint-Lô
 303 : Saint-Hilaire-du-Harcouët – Vire – Saint-Lô – Lison
 304 : Brécey – Villedieu-les-Poêles – Saint-Lô – Lison

Air and river transport
Despite its status of prefecture, there is no airfield in the vicinity of the town. The nearest is that of Lessay, and for an airport, to join that of Caen-Carpiquet, Cherbourg-Maupertus or Rennes – Saint-Jacques.

It is no longer possible, due to lack of maintenance of the various equipment and the Vire.

History
Saint-Lô has long been an important centre of the economy of Normandy. It has attracted the covetousness of neighboring nations, including England, resulting in many successive invasions. It lost its dominant position towards the end of the 19th century because it failed to take advantage of the first Industrial Revolution, which instead affected much of the predominantly peasant population. However, the decentralisation policy allowed the city to return to the foreground.

Briovère
Originally called Briovera (meaning "Bridge on the Vire River" in Gaulish) (often written in French as Briovère), the town is built on and around ramparts. The town started life as a Gallic fortified settlement, occupied by the tribe of the Unelli of Cotentin. Roman peace led the development of Gallo-Roman rural areas, on the model of the Roman villae rusticae as in Canisy, Marigny and Tessy-sur-Vire, whose names are based on the suffix -i, of location of Celtic origin *-i-āko-, and often composed with a Latin personal name, carried by a Gallo-Roman native. Then, the region was the scene of various Saxon invasions during the 3rd century. The Franks did not establish an administrative power there, although Briovera was nevertheless entitled to hammer coinage. Historian Claude Fauchet said, "the Coutentin, at the same time as our Merovingian kings, was inhabited by the Sesnes (Saxons), pirates, and seems to have been abandoned by Carolingians, as variable and too remote for correction by our kings, to the Normans and other plunderers of sea..."

Sainte-Croix Church was built in 300, said to be on the ruins of a temple of Ceres. Christianity grew quite late. There were only four  before 511. Laud of Coutances, bishop in 525–565, had a residence here. After his death he was beatified and was particularly honoured by Briovera, which would have housed his tomb. A pilgrimage was conducted and the city took the name of Saint-Laud, and then the name Saint-Lô which has been known since the 8th century.

Middle Ages

The Bretons, led by King Salomon, began to occupy the west coast of the Cotentin Peninsula from 836. Before their advances, in August 867, Charles the Bald gave Salomon the Comitatus Constantiensis, territory over which he had little influence. In 889, the Vikings travelled up the Vire and besieged Saint-Lô. Protected by solid ramparts built, according to tradition, in the early 9th century by Charlemagne, the town did not initially surrender. The attackers then cut the water supply, resulting in the surrender of the inhabitants. The Vikings massacred the inhabitants, including the Bishop of Coutances, and then razed the town. The seat of the diocese moved to Rouen. It was only in 1025 that Bishop Herbert decided to return to the walls of Saint-Lô and restore the episcopal see. Then, under Geoffrey de Montbray, the town experienced a great economic development, taking advantage of the Norman expedition in Sicily. Robert Guiscard, a close associate of Geoffrey, brought important loot to Apulia and Calabria, and it was thanks to this treasure that Geoffrey was able to rebuild Coutances Cathedral in 1056.

The population of the region participated in the conquest of England. Henry I, Count of Cotentin and eventually King of England strengthened Saint-Lô in 1090. In 1091, Geoffrey de Montbray, Bishop of Coutances, had a lock and mills built on the River Vire. With the death of Henry I in 1135, Stephen of Blois, Count of Mortain and Geoffrey of Anjou disputed the legitimacy of the realm. Saint-Lô sided with Stephen but was taken in 1139 by the Plantagenet army in just three days. The Archbishop of Canterbury, Thomas Becket, passed through Saint-Lô and a church, of which there remains no trace except the name of the Rue Saint-Thomas, was dedicated to him. In 1204, Saint-Lô submitted to Philip Augustus and became French. During this period of peace, the town prospered: It had the Hôtel-Dieu built on the edges of the town along with part of the Notre-Dame church and in 1234 a guild of tailors was established. Saint Louis came to the city twice, in 1256 and 1269. Saint-Lô was then the third largest town in the Duchy of Normandy after Rouen and Caen. In 1275 it received the right to mint coins from King Philip III of France, which it maintained until 1693. It specialised in tanneries with the designation  la vache de Saint-Lô [the cowhide of Saint-Lô]. After , its own trade of laces and leather aiguillettes amounted to one million in 1555; in knife making: A 16th century saying "Qui voudroit avoir bon couteau, Il faudroit aller à Saint-Lô" [Who would wish to have good knife, it would be necessary to go to Saint-Lô]; in goldsmithing; and in textiles, one of the main centres of France. There were more than 2,000 weavers, located mostly near the Dollée, a less powerful river than the Vire but with a smoother flow. Wool was imported from across the Cotentin peninsula. An order of 20 June 1460 fixed a special edge to the sheets of Saint-Lô.

On 24 September 1351 the king, John the Good, created a mint but did it did not receive the right to strike under the letter "S" in 1389. In January 1538, the letter "C" was attributed to him. The coins minted in Saint-Lô in the Middle Ages are also characterised by a "secret spot" under the nineteenth letter of the legend. The city was robbed of its monetary title in September 1693 in favour of Caen. Then, it returned to conflict with the Hundred Years' War. Geoffroy de Harcourt, a knight with franchises in Nord-Cotentin, betrayed the King of France and gave his homage to Edward III. In response, the barons Percy, Bacon and La Roche-Tesson were beheaded in Paris and their heads were exhibited in Saint-Lô for two years. The English landed at Saint-Vaast-la-Hougue on 12 July 1346 and then move upon Saint-Lô on 22 July. Jean Froissart describes "the big town of Saint-Leu in Constentin,... for the hard times, was rich and mercantile." The town was again sacked. Then the town was struck by the Black Death in 1347. Saint-Lô was reconquered in 1378 by Charles VI but it was again lost to English rule on 12 March 1418. During this period of political unrest, the lesser lords no longer knew where to place their allegiance. The French regained Saint-Lô on behalf of Charles VII on 12 September 1449. The king confirming the status of the Duchy of Normandy, it was the turn of the Duke of Brittany to occupy Manche, but Saint-Lô successfully repelled an attack in 1467, decimating a part of the Breton troops who were trapped by surprise in the Rue Torteron. On 9 November 1469, the ducal ring was broken and Normandy was definitively integrated into the Kingdom of France.

16th to 20th centuries

The period of peace had returned but the Cotentin lost its importance. Francis I was acclaimed at the door of the Neufbourg in 1532. In the 16th century, Protestantism won the round. Saint-Lô had a reformed church from 1555 and early printed books would be Protestant works. Saint-Lô suffered notably during the Wars of Religion. The Huguenots, holding Saint-Lô and Carentan, ransacked Coutances in 1562 and seized the Bishop Artus de Cossé-Brissac, who was dragged in the town of Saint-Lô on a donkey. Although, while the Edict of Pacification of Amboise had prompted the city to submit to Charles IX in February 1574, Norman Protestants made their headquarters in Saint-Lô. Troops led by the  besieged the city on 1 May, assaulted it 10 days later and captured it on 10 June. There were more than 500 deaths among those whose leader was Colombières, Lord of Bricqueville, but the Protestant Grand Captain Gabriel I of Montgomery escaped through the door of the Dollée. The town was ceded to  who built the citadel. Two years later the seigneury of the bishops of Coutances over the town ceased forever.

As a result of the war, in 1580, Saint-Lô lost the headquarters of the présidial, transferred to Coutances, capital of the bailiwick. In the mid-17th century part of the walls were destroyed, and the town grew with a new borough known as Neufborg. After the revocation of the Edict of Nantes (1685), most craftsmen abandoned Saint-Lô. The Revolt of the va-nu-pieds shook the area slightly in 1636, when the Government wanted to extend the gabelle in Cotentin. The region flourished especially in the manufacture of so-called d'estame wool socks. In 1678, the relics of Saint Laud were brought back to Notre-Dame. The route between Paris and Cherbourg, built to 1761, passes to Saint-Lô, facilitating trade. The French Revolution of 1789 overthrew the administrative division of the France and the capital of the department was temporarily set at Coutances between 1794 and 1796. Saint-Lô took the  "Rocher de la Liberté" [Rock of Freedom] and a tree was planted on the Champ de Mars. The city was relatively untouched during the Reign of Terror although there were some clashes with the Chouans.

The Napoleonic period saw the creation of the national stud. In 1827, Marie Thérèse of France, Duchess of Angoulême, passed through Saint-Lô and she was struck by the beauty of the landscape. She then planned to bring the sea to Saint-Lô making the River Vire navigable. Then, by order of 10 July 1835, the Vire was classified as navigable. Baron Alfred Mosselman built a port at Saint-Lô in recruiting nearly 250 military detainees and Spanish prisoners. A boatyard was created and traffic flowed at 50 tons in 1841 to more than 132 in 1846.  then launched barges and introduced horse traction by arranging the towpaths of the waterway. It thus passed from 1,233 tonnes of lime production in 1841 to 30,000 in 1858. In 1867, the paper mill of Valvire was built near the spillway and manufactured packing paper. It was destroyed by fire in 1930 and little remains beyond the chimney of the plant.

Saint-Lô ruled out the Mantes-la-Jolie–Cherbourg railway because its inhabitants, having fear of industrial progress, refused a path linking them to Paris. It would be attached to the rail network in 1860. In the 19th century, Saint-Lô, in the heart of a rich farming area, established itself as an important place for trade in animals, but the fear of the rural population towards the industrial revolution was blocking its development. River traffic transit saw 53,000 tonnes of goods, only 6% of which were foodstuffs. A leak was discovered in the canal and the River Vire was decommissioned in 1926. The region experienced a significant rural exodus and suffered casualties of the war of 1870 and the First World War. The Valvire paper mill burned down in the 1930s and would never be rebuilt. The demographics of the department was very negative from 1850. The city entered World War II in a declining situation.

In 1914 and 1915, Saint-Lô welcomed the temporary hospital No. 2 of the 10th Army Corps.

The criminal case of Jean Philippe took place in Saint-Lô, and was then judged by the Court of Assizes of Manche, at Coutances on 9 December 1940.

World War II

France was invaded in 1940 and the 7th Panzer Division, commanded by Rommel, entered Normandy. The objective being the capture of the city of Cherbourg, the centre of Manche was bypassed as the German Army occupied Saint-Lô, a strategic crossroads, on the night of 17 June 1940. In March 1943, the Germans decided to dig a tunnel under the rock. For the time being, no one is able to say what the usefulness of this tunnel would have been, though it was dug at the same time as the Agneaux Institute. Workers from the STO would be required until the beginning of the Battle of Normandy. Then, the underground, under construction, would house the sick of the Hôtel-Dieu located opposite and a part of the Saint-Lô population.

A German soldier was shot in January 1944 and several local people were arrested. The cinema, theatre and bars were closed, radios confiscated and the curfew was extended to 8pm.

During the Liberation, Saint-Lô suffered two series of air attacks during the Battle of Normandy. The first was the bombardment of the city by the Americans during the night of D-Day 6–7 June 1944. The first American air strike killed almost eight hundred civilians. Allied planes continued to attack the power plant and rail facilities daily for a week.

A second series of air attacks began on 17 July, during the Battle of Saint-Lô, which would give its name to the USS St. Lo.  This time the city was bombed by the Germans. As a main transport center, the city was a nexus of military activity starting the Battle of Normandy and on to the breakout from Normandy, Operation Cobra. As a result of air and ground attacks, Saint-Lô was almost totally destroyed (90–95% according to common estimates). The city was dubbed "The Capital of the Ruins" by Samuel Beckett. Saint-Lô was one of the key cities to the opening of the Falaise Gap, which ultimately allowed Allied forces to expel the Germans from northern France.

By order of Major General Charles Gerhardt, a jeep carried the body of Major Thomas Howie, later immortalized as "The Major of St. Lô", wrapped in a flag on its hood so that it could be said that he was the first American to enter the city.

Suffered on the night of 6–7 June, with a heroic calm, an air bombardment to such a point that its inhabitants could consider themselves as citizens of the capital of the ruins". These awards would be given on 6 June by President Vincent Auriol. The two communes, now absorbed from Sainte-Croix-de-Saint-Lô and Saint-Thomas-de-Saint-Lô, were also decorated with the Croix de Guerre 1939–1945 on 11 November 1948.

Postwar period

After the war the question arose as to whether the town should be rebuilt or left with its ruins intact as a testimony to the bombing. One American soldier laconically commented: "We sure liberated the hell out of this place".

Almost totally destroyed (97%), Saint-Lô had the unenviable nickname of Capital of Ruins, an expression attributed to Archbishop Bernard Jacqueline. It was the reason which compelled the prefect of the ruins  to settle in Coutances. This Capital of Ruins was revived by Samuel Beckett in his text The Capital of Ruins of 10 June 1946, which he wrote for Raidió Éireann, proving how much it remained marked by what he had seen and done in Saint-Lô. The Notre-Dame church located on the ramparts still bears the scars of bombing and bloody clashes which took place. The population timidly returned to the city. There were 180 people on 12 August 1944, but U.S. authorities decided not to issue authorisation of residence and supplied tickets. A lengthy clean-up began, including the corpses of residents and soldiers, which lasted until 15 October 1944. However, officials hesitated to rebuild Saint-Lô. Indeed, some were willing to leave the ruins as a testament to the martyrdom of the city and later rebuild a new Saint-Lô. The population declined, preferring to reinhabit its city.

In April 1945, the  Minister Raoul Dautry advocated a provisional wooden barracks building. These huts are built through the generosity of the donations. Thus, the association of the  unblocked an appropriation of 620,000 Swiss francs to build homes and a community centre. On 10 October 1949, Switzerland offered a gold ingot to the city which yielded 649,490 francs. There were ten housing estates in 1948, some which contained over 70 houses. The barracks were delivered in kit form, and it was enough to build them on the spot. Each had different specifics according to their place of origin (Swedish, Finnish, Swiss, French, American, Canadian). The Irish Red Cross participated in the construction of a 100-bed hospital consisting of 25 buildings (located level with the Pasteur college) and landed 174 tons of equipment starting in August 1945. The hospital was inaugurated on Sunday, 7 April 1946 and the Irish medical team left Saint-Lô at the beginning of January 1947. This hospital, consisting of wooden shacks, operated until 1956.

By 1948, a more permanent Saint-Lô had to be rebuilt. This would be done on the basis of plans designed by the Chief Architect of the reconstruction André Hilt (died 1946), which had proposed to retain the general fabric of the town by adapting it to modern needs. President Vincent Auriol laid the first stone just four years after landing.

As partial reparation for the destruction of the city, the Americans, behind the bombing, decided to build a modern hospital. The plans were made by the architect Paul Nelson, who decided to build a contemporary-style building. It is located on the Route de Villedieu. Work began in 1949, and it was completed on 10 May 1956. A monumental mosaic was made by Fernand Léger, which pays tribute to peace and Franco-American friendship: Both hands towards the Cotentin Peninsula symbolised with an apple tree branch in bloom. It was at that time the largest hospital in Europe. On 29 November 1949, the journalist Frédéric Pottecher submitted a hypothesis to not move the prefecture of Manche from Saint-Lô. Although, during the reconstruction, it was temporarily placed in Coutances. The whole of the population reacted and a petition collected more than 2,400 signatures: in the journal le Réveil, an article quotes:

The prefecture returned to Saint-Lô in 1953, into new premises.

Saint-Lô was rebuilt. The dominant style was a neo-regionalist functionalism which was dominated by concrete. Its dated and monotonous character was soon criticised. If this choice, dictated by the circumstances and the immediate problems of the housing of Saint-Lô, leaves regrets today, it makes Saint-Lô, on a smaller scale than Le Havre or Lorient, one of the most striking testimonies of the reconstruction period. A few streets contain vestiges of the old Saint-Lô: some houses on the Rue du Neufbourg, Rue Croix-Canuet and Falourdel, Rue Saint-Georges and Porte au Four. This last street houses the last medieval way of Saint-Lô. In 1964, Saint-Lô absorbed two neighbouring communes, Sainte-Croix-de-Saint-Lô (660 inhabitants in 1962, to the east of the territory) and Saint-Thomas-de-Saint-Lô (306 inhabitants to the south). The town benefitted from the economic growth of the Trente Glorieuses and the population grew by 30% between 1968 and 1975. It built neighbourhoods of buildings in the Valley of the Dollée and Val Saint-Jean. The theatre, meanwhile, was inaugurated in 1963.

The square of the town hall was completely redeveloped in the 1990s. The city organised a large demonstration on the occasion of the fiftieth anniversary of the Normandy landings. The edges of the Vire were reconfigured with the rehabilitation of the towpath and the creation of a green beach, at the Place du Quai-à-Tangue. A scow was rebuilt and crossed the river, in order to remember former river traffic. In 2004, the rural area of Bois-Jugan was urbanised, with the creation of housing within a framework of preservation of green spaces and a large aquatic centre. Later, the Des Ronchettes water tower was built following an unusual method for the time, since the tank (strongly resembling a flying saucer) was built at the ground level, then raised by a system of jacks, as the rings composing its body were manufactured. As such, its elevation allows a mounting point for telecommunication (mobile phone, WiMAX, and FM radio) networks.

Politics and administration

List of mayors

During the Revolution
For the revolutionary period, the destruction of most of the archives does not allow a definitive result.

Empires and Restoration

Third Republic

Since 1944
In 1944, the municipal council was suspended and a municipal delegation, chaired by Georges Lavalley, was temporarily responsible for administering the city.

Demography

Demographic evolution
In 2017, the commune had 19,116 inhabitants.

Age structure
In 2017, the distribution of the population of the commune by age group was as follows:

Heraldry

Economy

The city, at a crossroads between Caen, Cherbourg and Rennes, has a natural vocation of marketplace in the centre of the Manche bocage. A city of craftsmen and trade, which owes part of its prosperity to its status of prefecture, it has experienced a late industrialisation and attempts to assert its place, today, in the regional agri-food industry. Despite this, the Saint-Lô country became one of the less industrial areas of the region. Its unemployment rate of 6.7% also hides an exodus of young workers to the area of Caen and Rennes. The entry into service of the  helped open up the centre of Manche and create a new industrial zone (ZAC Neptune).

In 2008, Saint-Lô was equipped with fibre optic cable to allow companies and individuals to have very high speed internet (approximately 1 Gbps and 100 Mbit/s for individuals). Companies should have had access to this speed by September 2008, with individuals not before September 2009. Saint-Lô will be one of the first cities in France of this size to be equipped with a fibre optic internet network.

Tax rate

Industries

Lecapitaine: Manufacturer of automotive bodywork and refrigeration, a subsidiary of Petit Forestier (320 employees – €33M turnover).
Moulinex: The Moulinex factory has long been the largest plant in Saint-Lô. When the group went bankrupt in 2004, the factory was a subsidiary of SEB, and general company for electric motors was revived as Euromoteurs, with SEB as the only customer. Part of the production lines were dismantled, sold to China and resettled there by the Green de Gourfaleur company. The Saint-Lô site had 150 employees and manufactured small and medium power electric motors. Suffering from only having the single client SEB, Euromoteurs was put into liquidation in 2007.
Alios, production plant which manufactures smart cards and CEV, a company that manages electronic transactions, grouped in the same building (80 employees) and subsidiaries of the Group Chèque Déjeuner. It is one of the key players in the Secure Electronic Transactions .
MT Verbom, company specialising in press tools. Created in 1985 on the Promenade des ports, the Martignoni-Traisnel company specialises in the production of auto parts, and moved in 1990 into the Chevallerie zone. In 1998 the company became closer with Canadian group Verbom and employed 65 people on the site in 2008.

Tertiary sector
The town of Saint-Lô is very oriented towards services, thus since the fall of Moulinex, the France-United States Memorial Hospital became the first employer in the city. There are many jobs in administration related to its status of prefecture. Finally, many businesses have developed along the ring road.

Agriculture and agro-food hub
The city hosts activities associated with the rearing of cattle and horses. Each week, a calf market took place in the market installed until 30 December 2008 near Les Ronchettes. From January 2009, it was removed and attached to the calf market at Torigni-sur-Vire. The city also has the Livestock Promotion Centre, located next to the stud farm, which hosts the equestrian competition of the Normandy horse show, each year in August. The agri-food cluster has developed since 1990 with the aim of hosting companies in this sector, several public or parapublic bodies are installed:

Adria normandie: technical advice centre for agro-processing.
The agri-food nursery.
Lilano: Laboratoire interprofessionnel laitier de Normandie [Inter-professional dairy laboratory of Normandy].
The Centre of agri-food formation of Saint-Lô, an extension of the Thère Farming School located at Le Hommet-d'Arthenay.
Ardefa: Association régionale pour le développement de l'emploi et des formations dans les industries alimentaires [Regional Association for the development of employment and training in the food industries.]
Workshop of agri-food rotation.
The agri-food park of Saint-Georges-Montcocq / Le Mesnil-Rouxelin on which the master dairies are established; through lack of implementation, much remains undeveloped.

In 2008, the only success in the agri-food field was the success of the France Kebab enterprise, which had won many prizes in 2007.

Media

Several regional media are disseminated in Saint-Lô and have an office.

 (weekly newspaper), headquarters
Ouest-France (daily press), departmental daily
 (daily press)
, formerly Radio Manche (radio)
 (radio)

Education

University Institute of Technology

Professional licence, development and protection of the cultural heritage, option virtual reality and multimedia training
Professional licence, management maintenance and industrial exploitation.

School of Management and Commerce
The School of Management and Commerce of Saint-Lô was established in 1988 under the auspices of the FIM Group and is currently headed by Yves Ricolleau. A member of the national network of the EGC, the school offers  consisting of three years of responsible marketing, commercialisation and management. The school gains about 40 new students each year.

Garrisons

Saint-Lô has been the site of various garrisons at the Bellevue barracks:
 ? – 1923 : 3 battalions (1st, 2nd and 3rd) of the 
 1924–1929 : 1st Battalion of the 1st Colonial
 1929–1939 : 
 ? – ? : 
 1963 – ? : 512th Transport Group, coming from Constantine
 1978–1984 : 1st RIMA

Culture

Facilities

The Jean Lurçat Cultural Centre: media library, auditorium, drawing school and community building.
Municipal music school
The Roger Ferdinand Theatre
The Normandy: concert hall for current music
Lieu Pluri-artistique Art Plume [Multi-artistic Pen Art Place] in the Valley of the Dollée
The cinema Cinemoviking, on Esplanade Jean-Grémillon.

The Cinemoviking cinema opened on 1 April 2009, and was the first cinema of Lower Normandy to offer 3D films.

Events

Asian Culture Festival and manga (in February)
Housing fair: Parc des expos (late February)
The Hétéroclites (in June): Street theatre, acrobatics, music, in the bucolic atmosphere of the Valley of the Dollée.
Festival of the Vire: At the Plage verte (last weekend in June)
Festival of music with the Tendance Live Show organised by 
Chess Festival (early July) Festival
Criterium of the ramparts of Saint-Lô: Around the Enclos (last Wednesday of July)
The Jeudis du haras [Thursdays of the Stud]: Saint-Lô stud farm (July and August)
Normandy horse show: equine complex (August)
Foire aux Croûtes et à la brocante [Fair of the Crusts and of the flea market]: City centre (in September): exhibition and sale of paintings of local artists and garage sale
: Choral festival (October, biennial; ended in 2014)
Challenges de la ville de Saint-Lô de tir [Challenges of the city of Saint-Lô of shooting] (rifle, pistol and field crossbow) organised annually by Saint-Lô shooting club at the Salle Saint-Ghislain on the Rue de l'Exode, the second weekend of October.
Fair of Saint-Lô: Parc des expos (October)
National stallion competition (October)
Sonic Meetings (in November), music festival

Personalities linked to the commune

Births

Jacques Davy Duperron (1556–1618), poet and diplomat.
 (1778–1847), miniaturist of the 19th century.
Urbain Le Verrier (1811–1877), astronomer and mathematician, born in Saint-Lô where he spent the first years of his childhood. A plaque is installed at the Place du Champ-de-Mars on the building where he lived.
 (1819–1867), physician
 (1820–1893), legal and artistic personality of Manche and grandson of the last Viscount Granville, .
Octave Feuillet (1821–1890), writer, was born and died in Saint-Lô. His birthplace is 2 Rue Saint-Georges. A novelist and playwright who gained success under the Second Empire, he was considered a 'bourgeois writer' of that era and was elected to the Académie française when 40 years old.
 (1832–1906), woman of letters and wife of the previous
 (1880–1915), cartoonist
 (1897–1944), resistant, died during deportation
Jacques Datin (1920–1973), composer who wrote for France Gall, Juliette Gréco, Serge Lama, Claude Nougaro, Édith Piaf, etc.
 (1929), director of IT companies, son of 
 (1932), son of Raymond Brulé
Claude Rolley, (1933–2007), archaeologist, Emeritus Professor of the University of Burgundy, writer on the art of Gaul and ancient Greece, President of the 
Jean Teulé (1953), novelist, who also performed in film and on television
Jacky Vimond (1961), first French motocross rider to become world champion in 1986
, designer writer
, gold medallist team rider at the 2002 FEI World Equestrian Games
Alexis Loret (1975), actor who was in the film  by Valérie Guignabodet
Hugues Duboscq, French swimmer, bronze medallist in the 100m breaststroke at the 2004 and 2008 Summer Olympics
Mathieu Johann, singer, candidate in the fourth season of Star Academy
Benoit Lesoimier, professional footballer who plays for Stade Brestois 29.
Florian Geffrouais (1988), decathlete.

Others
 (1746–1818), the last Viscount of Granville, died at Saint-Lô, where he was president of the court of first instance, on 30 August 1818
 (1746–1835), deputy Mayor of Saint-Lô, public prosecutor and president of the Criminal Court of Manche, deputy of Manche in the Council of Ancients.
 (1755–1829), lawyer in Saint-Lô and member of the convention
 (1764–1827), military
 (1768–1826), politician of Manche was a borough councillor of Saint-Lô under the Empire
Jean Follain, author, devoted a book entitled Chef-lieu (1950), in Saint-Lô where he spent his adolescence. Many documents are gathered in the Museum of Fine Arts of the city
Samuel Beckett, Nobel Prize winning writer, who enlisted as a steward at the Irish Hospital of Saint-Lô. He dedicated four lines which are today engraved at the entrance to the Museum of Fine Arts.
Paul-Jacques Bonzon, youth novelist
Albert II, current Prince of Monaco, who carries Baron of Saint-Lô amongst .
Ant Middleton, the British former special forces soldier, TV personality and author, lived in the town with his family in the late 1980s and early 1990s.

Sports

Sports disciplines

Football

In 2004, the club was playing in the CFA. The club home is the recently built .

The Union sportive Sainte-Croix-de-Saint-Lô develops a football team in the League of Lower Normandy and two others in district divisions.

Other sports clubs
: Baseball team was twice champion of France (1996 and 1997). Evolving in the Championship of France elite in 2006, the club was dropped for the 2007 season for financial reasons and evolved at the regional level in 2008.
The Normandy Horse Show is a major riding event for the promotion of the saddle horse. The annual event takes place around the week of 15 August.
Team Nissan France Dessoude, directed by André Dessoude, participates in Rally raid Championship, including the Dakar Rally. In 2002, he hired Johnny Hallyday.
ASPTT Saint-Lô Handball inhabited the French  in 2012.
Saint-Lô Rugby Club.
Saint-Lô shooting club, formerly Buffalo Club, created 4 August 1952; the main shooting stand is located at 91 Rue Poterne to the level of the Tour des Beaux-Regards in the tunnels of the old unfinished German underground hospital, dug during the World War II.
Agneaux-Saint-Lô Chess Club. Recognised as one of the most dynamic chess clubs in France. The young team is part of the Top 16, first national division.
, the first club of floorball in Manche.
ARC Club saint-lois: Archery club established in 1977, premier club in Manche.
Patronage laïque saint-lois [Saint-lois secular patronage]: Table tennis club.

Facilities

Sports complex of Saint-Ghislain (former indoor pool on Rue de l'Exode):
Weight room
Marcel Cerdan Boxing Hall
Straw wall, in the gym, for archery
Stadium
Tennis courts
André-Guilbert – Maréchal-Juin Gym
Gym Hall of the Bois Ardent & Dojo Alain-Crépieux Dojo – Place George Pompidou
Table tennis hall –  Rue du Mesnilcroc
Complex of the Vaucelle: Jean-Berthelem Stadium – base of canoeing
 – Ronchettes: football pitch
Aurora Stadium – Ronchettes: rugby ground
Fernand-Beaufils Sports Centre – Champs de Mars: basketball, fencing room
Aquatic Centre – Bois Jugan, opened in January 2005. It has a 25 m pool with a movable floor to adjust depth, a leisure pool (wild river, seat massage, etc.), a wading pool, an outdoor pool open year-round and a gym (cold bath, Jacuzzi, hammam, fitness room and massage shower).
The tennis courts of the Memorial Tennis Club – 
Equestrian centre of the Gourmette saint-loise
Squash – Bois Jugan (near the aquatic centre)
Compact golf – Bois Jugan
Archery field – Rue Valvire (at the end)
Baseball field.

Sites and monuments

Religious heritage

Church of Notre-Dame

The  is a monument of Flamboyant Gothic style erected on four centuries from the end of the 13th century to replace the former castle's chapel. It is located in the Enclos surrounded by ramparts and was listed on the register of historic monuments in 1840. The outdoor pulpit was noted and drawn by Victor Hugo, which he called 'unique' in a letter to Adèle Foucher. He protected it from demolition, which was planned prior to town renovation in 1863.

The building suffered heavy destruction during World War II, although it was among the only standing buildings after the 1944 bombings. If the stained-glass windows were saved, after being always present since temporary removal during the war, the nave was gutted following the collapse of the North Tower which was shelled by German artillery. Its roof and façade were destroyed, as well as the top of the other tower. Instead of rebuilding the church identically, the architect of Historic Monuments decided to build a greenschist frontage to highlight the scar left by the war. The statue of Notre-Dame du Pilier is from 1467; having been destroyed and remade several times, it is now housed on a column in the apse chapel.

Church of Sainte-Croix

The  is, according to the tradition, the heir of a chapel built here by St. Helena in the 4th century and of an abbey founded by Charlemagne. Better documented is the creation of an Augustinian abbey by Algar, the new bishop of Coutances (formerly the prior of Bodmin Priory, Cornwall) in 1132. The Romanesque church was consecrated in 1202, being largely remade in the following centuries with successive renovations. The choir was remade in the 16th century while the bell tower is from 1860 to 1863. During World War II, the bell tower (located laterally) collapsed and it was on its ruins where the body of Major Howie was placed; a new bell tower was rebuilt in 1957 on the forecourt in a modern style. On the church square stands the departmental monument in memory of the victims of the wars of Algeria and Indochina, opened in 2005.

Cemetery of Saint-Lô
The cemetery of Saint-Lô is located between the Saint-Croix Church and the national stud, on the Route de Lison. The cemetery is much marked by the Second World War with the plot of the civilian victims of the bombing of 1944, also the mausoleum of the Blanchet family, and Major Glover S. Johns Junior who installed the first command post before releasing the city. One can still find the tomb of the  Dagobert. Also note the weeping statue which has traces of shrapnel, a bronze sculpture of Cabet, who was a student of F. Rude.

Other buildings

The parish of Saint-Lô has other Catholic buildings:

Church of Saint Jean-Eudes located in Val Saint-Jean
The chapel of the Memorial Hospital
The chapel of the Saint Jean clinic
The chapel of the Bon-Sauveur psychiatric hospital
The John XXIII Chapel in the Dollée quarter

The city also has a temple of the Protestant Reformed Church of France. It was built by architect Verrey with the glazing of Max Ingrand and was inaugurated on 23 October 1955.

Historical civil heritage
Several sites are registered as historic monuments:

The Madeleine Chapel.
The Château de la Vaucelle, registered on 11 July 1975.
Notre-Dame church, recorded in 1840, contains ten objects registered in respect of objects classified as historical monuments.
The Sainte-Croix church.
The National Stud and its park, registered on 18 February 1993.
The Manor of Bosdel, constructed between the 16th and 18th centuries, registered as an historic monument on 1 April 1946.
The remains of the walls recorded on 12 December 1945 but the Rue de la poterne and the Place des Beaux-Regards had been registered as early as 22 October 1937.

The Maison-Dieu [House of God] (not to be confused with the Hôtel-Dieu) located opposite the church and built in the second half of the 15th century was razed during the bombings of 1944. This bourgeois construction presented a half-timbered façade with corbels and sculptures. Another House, called Poids Royal, located in the quad at 11 Rue Thiers in the Enclos had been included in historical monuments on 3 October 1929, it was also destroyed.

Ramparts

Saint-Lô also has remains of its medieval line of walls. Ramparts still exist on three of the four sides of the Enclos. The remains include: Tour des Beaux-Regards ("Tower of Beautiful Glances"), commanding the steepest part of the spur of the town, and the Tour de la Poudrière ("Tower of the Gunpowder Store"), an impressive military relic of the old citadel, are the two most notable elements of the ramparts. On the south side, the wartime disaster of 1944 had the paradoxical effect of clearing the base, where houses had grown around the Rue du Torteron.

National Stud

Saint-Lô is home to the largest of the 23 national stud farms in France. From its origin, the deposit was installed on buildings and abandoned land of the old Abbey of Sainte-Croix ( first leased and then owned from 22 September 1807). The stud then recruited from the breeding of the Haras du Pin.

In 1826, the military remount depot moved premises which the stud had given to it; most stallions were taken from the stud to provide cavalry. On 28 May 1874, the Boscher Law enabled supervision of the allocations of the regiments and allowed to provide the stud with over 230 horses. On 28 June 1881, the municipal council decided to transfer the stud to adjoin the Route de Bayeux. Thus, the current stud farm buildings date from 1884 (the first stone was laid on 11 June 1884), and the transfer was finished three years later. During World War I, five mares out of six were requisitioned, but no stallions. Grooms fought at the front, and German prisoners dug a pond. In 1939, the old stable housed the staff of the Haras de Strasbourg (40 stallions and staff) at the time of the German breakthrough. Then, in 1944, fifty horses were killed by the bombing and other stallions were stolen by German soldiers in flight. The old stud was destroyed and claimed by the city. Thus, there only remains the street of the same name and the Normandy building which was previously the former riding school. The new stud was then built. General de Gaulle offered to the Sultan of Morocco Bois de Rose, a thoroughbred which had been stationed at the stud for two years. The stud then grew gradually in the field of reproduction, by investing in an artificial insemination centre, a centre for the freezing of semen and an embryo transfer unit. Thus, the electoral district of Saint-Lô has the highest density of breeding deposits of France.

Château de la Vaucelle

Located on the bank of the Vire, the  belongs to the Saint-Lois descendants of the 17th century diarist Luc Duchemin. The Sainte-Pernelle Chapel is the work of a Lord of the Vaucelle Jean Boucart, confessor of Louis XI and founder of the parish library of Saint-Lô, which was at the time the second library of Normandy by importance. Three kings resided at the Vaucelle: Edward III in 1346, at the beginning of the Hundred Years' War the king found that it was not a safe city, Francis I during his visit in 1532 and Charles IX. The dovecote and the northern wall niche are listed as protected elements.

Museums

Museum of Fine Arts

Built by the architect Eugène Leseney, the Jean-Lurçat Cultural Centre is situated on the Place du Champ-de-Mars, opposite the Sainte-Croix Church. It houses the Museum of Fine Arts where, within the collections of the city since 1989, are found: The writings and sketches of Jean Follain, paintings by Corot, Guillaume Fouace, Eugène Boudin.

Museum of the Norman Bocage

Boisjugan farm is a farmhouse from the 17th century which was in use until 1970. Converted into a museum, it traces the history and ethnography of agriculture in the Norman bocage since the 18th century with agricultural practices, horse and cattle breeding. Typical sites are reconstructed (workshop, stable, barn and creamery).

Chapel of Madeleine

The  is located right next to the national stud, on the road to Bayeux. It is a relic of a former leprosarium from the 14th century. It was classified as an historical monument on 3 August 1974 and was restored between 1988 and 1994. A memorial was inaugurated in May 1995 in honour of the soldiers of the 29th and 35th divisions who liberated Saint-Lô in 1944. Photos, commemorative plaques, tables and flags are on display.

Other notable places
A memorial in the city honours Major Thomas Howie, Commander of the 3d Battalion, 116th Infantry Regiment of the U.S. Army's 29th Division; the unit that liberated the city on 18 July 1944. Howie was killed just before his unit entered the city and was so highly respected that his men placed his flag-draped body on the hood of a jeep at the front of the column so he could be the first American to enter the city. He became famous as the "Major of Saint-Lô".

Place de la Mairie

Redesigned in 1990, the city square is all black asphalt lit by spotlights on the ground. At night it has a resemblance to an airport runway. The statue of the dairywoman or Femme d'Isigny [Woman of Isigny] can be seen at the top of the square.  (1848–1918) introduced a plaster statue in 1887, a Norman woman marked by the hard work of the Earth, a milk rod (a typical Normandy container) on her shoulder. A few years later, the bronze arrived in Saint-Lô. It is set on a round plinth, surrounded by a basin, on the Place des Beaux-Regards in front of the Notre-Dame church. She moved a little further when the Poilu of the Great War was installed. It was then unbolted and melted on 8 February 1942, by the Germans, to recover the bronze for the arms industry. In January 1984, André Leplanquais, a merchant of Saint-Lô, wanted to create a replica of this statue. A fundraiser gained significant donations from residents. Once the money was together, the sculptor , the famous sculptor of Ernée, fashioned a new statue based on the original plans. Moved several times, one can find it near stairs of the square. The base and the granite basin are the original.

The Havin fountain also created by Arthur Le Duc in 1887 was located near the Museum of Saint-Lô; its statue was also melted by the Germans, however no replica has been created. Nearby is the prison entrance, a remnant of the bombing in 1944. An urn containing the ashes of deportees is placed at the foot of it. A memorial in honour of the victims of Nazi repression, it became the departmental monument to the Resistance. The belfry can also be observed from the square, which seems to spring from the heart of the city. Built in 1954, it was once used to dry the hoses of firefighters. Renovated several times since 1990, it is the symbol of the reconstruction of the city. At the top are a weathervane in the shape of Unicorn and a viewpoint, from which one can admire the entire region. Previously open to the public by the tourist office, its access is now forbidden.

The Caisse d'Épargne squirrel
A granite statue representing a squirrel can be seen in Saint-Lô, which is the logo of the Caisse d'Épargne banking group; It is located in the Rue Saint-Thomas. What may seem incongruous, it is that there's no bank of this group nearby. However, the bank did have a branch in front, but it was moved in the 1990s. Then arose the question of whether or not to keep the statue for advertising purposes. The people of Saint-Lô had become attached to the squirrel, and it was finally decided to leave it in place.

Quarters

The town of Saint-Lô consists of a number of quarters:

The Val Saint-Jean, composed mainly of buildings and apartment towers.
The Aurore, composed mostly of single family homes and social housing. One can discover, the Rue des Sycamores open school of Aurore. This modern architecture is a work of Eugène Leseney.
The Dollée composed mainly of a large number of social and private apartment buildings.
La Ferronnière
The Enclos, historic centre of the city within the walls with its prefectural administrative centre.

Parks and green spaces

The commune is a floral city, having obtained three flowers in the Concours des villes et villages fleuris [contest of floral cities and villages].

The public garden: It is located in the Enclos, between the Tour des Beaux-Regards and the administrative area. The view is breathtaking on the Vire and Rue Torteron.
The Plage Verte [Green Beach]: A green space created in 2001 on part of the old tangue wharf in the vicinity of the River Vire, between the ramparts and the railway station. The modern Henri Liébard footbridge connects the two banks of the river roughly at the location of the former which had been destroyed during the bombing of June 1944. It is also the setting of the festival of the Vire which is held annually during the last weekend of June. It also allows access to the piers for boat tours.
The islands of the river Vire: Lebroussois island and Möselman Island are separated by the weir. An arboretum has been planted at the foot of the brick chimney, only remnant of the paper mill which was burned in the 1930s.
The towpath: Between the station and the Rocreuil bridge, many Saint-Lô people walk, do their jogging and cycling there. One can see the Château de la Vaucelle.
The Valley of the Dollée: At the foot of the Route de Lison, there is a mill race and a watermill and a fitness trail. It is also part of the festival of "hétéroclites".
The Boisjugan Urban Park: A green area linking the new subdivisions, which border it, and the old farmland property of the city which borders the south ring road. It includes green spaces with ponds and wetlands, crossed by stone walkways overlooking the old paths, all exclusively for walkers. There is also a playground for children and a fitness trail.
The village of : In the middle of the Saint-Lô bocage, Le Hutrel has a village festival, in its square, every year on Ascension Thursday.
The park of the Haras de Saint-Lô: Park and gardens protected as historical monuments since 18 February 1993.

The city has also two  according to the CAUE 50 that are a saucer magnolia, located in a courtyard of the Rue du Neufbourg, and a giant sequoia, located in the courtyard of the district school, on Rue du Général Dagobert.

Twinning programmes and sponsorship
The town of Saint-Lô is twinned with:

 Saint-Ghislain, Belgium, since 9 September 1962
 Aalen, Germany, since 3 June 1979
 Christchurch, since 20 April 1985
 Kervénanec, Lorient, France, since 11 September 1988
 Roanoke, USA, since 19 June 1999

Saint-Lô is the sponsor of the patrol vessel , a P400-class patrol vessel of the French Navy, intended for protection tasks of exclusive economic zones or public service.

Philately
A French stamp representing the coat of arms of the city was issued on 17 December 1966, the stamp was the sixth of the Arms of cities series. Its face value was 20 centimes. It was designed by Mireille Louis.

See also
Communes of the Manche department
, the United States Navy escort carrier named after the city following the landings at the city following Operation Overlord. She was sunk by kamikaze aircraft during the Battle of Leyte Gulf, being the first kamikaze casualty of the war.
Fernand-Marie-Eugène Le Gout-Gérard

Notes

References

Bibliography
 : Document used as a source for the drafting of this article.

 
 
 
 
 
 
  
 
 
 
 
 
  
 
 
 
 
 
 
 
 
 
 
 
 
 
 
  
 
 
 
  
 
 
 
 
 
  
 
 
 
 
 
 
 
 
 
  
 
  
 
 
 
 
 
 
 
 
 
 
 
 
 
 
 
 
 
 
 
 
 
 Digital media

External links

 Town council website
 The bombing of Saint-Lo – June 1944
 The heroic and painful memory of the summer of 1944 (In French)
 History of the château and the churches of Saint-Lô (In French)
 Map of the commune in 1749
 Old views of Saint-Lô on the site of the Manche archives (In French)
 

Communes of Manche
Prefectures in France
Razed cities